Manfred Fischer (born 6 August 1995) is an Austrian footballer who plays for Austria Wien.

Career 
Manfred Fischer started his career at his hometown club Union Berlin. In 2006 he moved to the youth teams of SC Weiz. Three years later, the academy of Grazer AK got aware of the talented young player from Eastern Styria. At Grazer AK he also played for the reserves team, but after financial difficulties the club went into administration and had to release all players. Manfred Fischer followed his coach Gregor Pötscher to DSV Leoben. He made his first appearance in Regionalliga Mitte, Austria's 3rd highest league, against FC Gleisdorf 09. 

After two successful seasons, he moved to third division club SC Kalsdorf. A year later he was transferred to second division club SC Wiener Neustadt, where he played 65 games in two seasons. 

In 2017/18 he got an offer from TSV Hartberg, who was also playing in Austrian Football Second League. TSV Hartberg got promoted in this season, which was the biggest success in the club's history. 

After a very successful season, SCR Altach offered him a contract until June 2020. Fischer made his debut in Austria's highest league, Austrian Football Bundesliga, against SV Mattersburg where he was substituted for Stefan Nutz in the 68th minute. A week later he made his debut in the starting eleven against SK Rapid Vienna. He scored his first goal in Bundesliga in August 2018 against FC Red Bull Salzburg.

External links
 
 

1995 births
Living people
Austrian footballers
SC Wiener Neustadt players
DSV Leoben players
Association football midfielders
TSV Hartberg players
SC Rheindorf Altach players
FK Austria Wien players
2. Liga (Austria) players
Austrian Football Bundesliga players